The King Alfonso XIII's Cup 1922  was the 22nd staging of the Copa del Rey, the Spanish football cup competition.

The competition started on 12 March 1922, and concluded on 14 May 1922, with the final, held at the Campo de Coia in Vigo, in which FC Barcelona lifted the trophy for the fifth time with a 5–1 victory over Real Unión thanks to goals from Ramón Torralba, Josep Samitier, Paulino Alcántara (2) and Clemente Gràcia.

Teams
Biscay: Arenas Club de Getxo
Gipuzkoa: Real Unión
 Centre Region: Real Madrid
 South Region: Sevilla FC
Galicia: Fortuna Vigo
Asturias: Sporting de Gijón
Catalonia: FC Barcelona
Levante: España de Valencia

Quarterfinals

First leg

Second leg

Arenas Club de Getxo and Real Madrid won one match each. At that year, the goal difference was not taken into account. A replay match was played.

Real Unión qualified for the semifinals.

FC Barcelona qualified for the semifinals.

Sporting de Gijón qualified for the semifinals.

Replay matches

Semifinals

First leg

Second leg

Real Unión and Real Madrid won one match each. At that year, the goal difference was not taken into account. A replay match was played.

FC Barcelona qualified for the final.

Replay match

Real Unión qualified for the final.

Final

References

External links
Linguasport.com 
RSSSF.com

1922
1922 domestic association football cups
1921–22 in Spanish football